Jaap van Duijn (born 23 December 1990) is a Dutch footballer who plays as a striker.

Club career
Van Duijn grew up with hometown club Quick Boys and became as A junior plucked by PSV. In Eindhoven played the winger in PSV A1 and the team promise. The adventure in Brabant was not followed and Van Duijn moved to Feyenoord. In Rotterdam, he got the chance in the team promise. At the beginning of the 2010-2011 season Jaap van Duijn joined selecting Quick Boys. 
Thanks to a flying start, Van Duijn scored nine goals in the first half of the season and he aroused the interest of several professional football clubs. Ultimately, the choice of ADO Den Haag fell.

He made his debut on 21 July in the Europa League match against FK Tauras Tauragė. In Eredivisie he made his debut in the 4–2 defeat to FC Groningen. Van Duijn started at the Residence Club energetically and grew because of its striking hair into crowd favorite. Finally ended the adventure in a minor key. Van Duijn decided to surrender after he was put back to the amateurs his stuff. After one season with relegation soccer Spakenburg is the prodigal son back to Quick Boys.

From the summer of 2013 he played for Quick Boys, but left them after two seasons for fellow amateurs VV Noordwijk. He then moved on to FC Rijnvogels in 2016.

Career statistics

other statistics (exhibition game)

Honours
hoofdklasse A Saturday: 2010–2011 (runner-up)
hoofdklasse B Saturday: 2014-2015 (runner-up)
hoofdklasse B Saturday: 2015-2016 (runner-up)

References

1990 births
Living people
Footballers from Katwijk
Association football forwards
Dutch footballers
Quick Boys players
ADO Den Haag players
SV Spakenburg players
VV Noordwijk players
Eredivisie players
FC Rijnvogels players